The Best of Simon and Garfunkel is the fifth compilation album of greatest hits by Simon & Garfunkel, released by Columbia Records in 1999, containing 20 tracks.

Shortly after its release, this album was revised and re-issued as an expanded 2-CD version: “Tales from New York: The Very Best of Simon & Garfunkel”.

Track listing 
All songs written and composed by Paul Simon, except where noted.
 "The Sound of Silence" – 3:07
 "Homeward Bound" – 2:29
 "I Am a Rock" – 2:52
 "The Dangling Conversation" – 2:38
 "Scarborough Fair/Canticle" (Traditional, arranged by Simon, Art Garfunkel) – 3:10
 "The 59th Street Bridge Song (Feelin' Groovy)" – 1:55
 "A Hazy Shade of Winter" – 2:17
 "At the Zoo" – 2:17
 "Fakin' It (Mono version)" – 3:12
 "Mrs. Robinson" – 4:04
 "Old Friends/Bookends" – 3:57
 "The Boxer" – 5:10
 "Bridge over Troubled Water" – 4:54
 "Cecilia" – 2:56
 "The Only Living Boy in New York" – 3:59
 "Song for the Asking" – 1:52
 "El Condor Pasa (If I Could)" (Daniel Alomía Robles; English lyrics by Simon, arranged by Jorge Milchberg) – 3:08
 "For Emily, Whenever I May Find Her" (Live) – 2:22
 "America" – 3:37
 "My Little Town" – 3:52

Producers: Tom Wilson, Bob Johnston, John Simon, Paul Simon, Arthur Garfunkel, Roy Halee & Phil Ramone

Charts

Certifications

References

Simon & Garfunkel compilation albums
1999 greatest hits albums
Columbia Records compilation albums
Albums produced by Bob Johnston
Albums produced by Paul Simon
Albums produced by Roy Halee
Albums produced by Tom Wilson (record producer)
Albums produced by Art Garfunkel